Le Pas de Chavanette, also known as the "Mur Suisse" or "Swiss Wall", is a particularly steep and difficult piste in the Portes du Soleil ski area, on the border between France and Switzerland. It can be reached from the French resort of Avoriaz and from the Swiss towns of Les Crosets and Champéry. Effectively, one starts the run standing on the Swiss-French border, plunging down the Swiss side of the mountain towards Les Crosets.

Statistics 
The slope is classified in the Swiss/French difficulty rating as orange, which means that it is rated as too difficult to fit in the standard classification of green (very easy), blue (easy), red (intermediate) and black (difficult). It has a length of 1 kilometre and a vertical drop of 331 metres, starting at 2,151 metres above sea level.

Slope layout 
The slope has moguls throughout. It starts in a narrow pass on the mountain top with an inclication of 40 degrees. In winters with heavy snowfall, the moguls at the top can grow to enormous dimensions — the size of a small car — because of the heavy turns people take to compensate for the inclination and narrow slope.

After the initial 50 metres, the slope widens to the left, allowing skiers and boarders to traverse to a less steep area and make their descent by curving around the more steep and dangerous path directly down the slope.

The direct path goes into a pass between two rocky areas on the right hand side of the slope, about halfway down, which at its narrowest is about ten metres wide. This gives the skier or boarder an impression of being in a very steep half pipe with moguls.

After this passage, the slope eases out with fewer moguls, and narrows as the easier left-hand path merges with the direct path. The last two hundred metres are a flat run directly towards the chair lift back up the mountain, or the easier runs towards Les Crosets and Champéry.

How to ski/board it 
The initial 50 metres have to be skied or boarded by everyone taking Le Pas de Chavanette. Especially without fresh snow, the slope gets icy quickly, turning the area between moguls into ice sheets. Not making a turn in these situations means that you miss the next mogul, and pick up too much speed to make the next one after that, starting off a tumble that ends a couple of hundred metres down the slope, while hitting a few dozen icy bumps in the course.

After this initial stretch, the choice can be made, up until the rocky passage in the direct path, to escape to the less steep left hand side of the slope, where a stumble is less dangerous. The direct path down Le Pas de Chavanette, to the right hand side and down the rocky passage, should only be taken by very experienced skiers and riders who know how to handle moguls, as it is effectively a continuation of the first 50 metres.

As the slope eases out, it is easier to negotiate the moguls and make a single run down to the end, although the inclination and bumps still call for significant dexterity and physical strength.

Wearing protective gear like a helmet and a back protector is highly recommended.

References

External links 
 Map of the Les Crosets/Champéry ski area, including Le Pas de Chavanette
 Val-d'Illiez - Les Crosets - Champoussin web site
 Avoriaz web site
 Portes du Soleil web site
 Newspaper article on Le Pas de Chavanette

Geography of Haute-Savoie
Tourist attractions in Haute-Savoie